Carolyn Mugar is an Armenian-American activist, best known for founding the Armenia Tree Project. She is a prominent member of the Mugar family of Greater Boston.

Career

Mugar founded the Armenia Tree Project, alongside her late husband, in 1994 as a result of the environmental problems caused by the recent earthquake and the blockade of Armenia by Azerbaijan and Turkey.

She was handpicked to be the Executive Director and Officer of the Organization of Farm Aid by one of the founders, Willie Nelson. She is also the President of the Armenian Assembly of America.

In 2015, Mugar received an Honorary Doctor of Public Service from Suffolk University, the same university where her father received an honorary degree.

Personal life and family

Mugar married John T. O’Connor in 1997. O'Connor died in November 2001 of a heart attack, aged 46. She is the daughter of Stephen P. Mugar.

References

American people of Armenian descent
Living people
Year of birth missing (living people)
21st-century American women